Now is the third studio album released by The Tubes. It was produced by John Anthony. Fed up with constant meddling from Bud Scoppa and Don Wood under the direction of Bill Spooner including surreptitiously remixing a track when Anthony was not at the studio, Anthony was advised to leave the project by Jerry Moss. The head of A&M A&R Kip Cohen said that they took advantage of Anthony and believed that they overran the budget to increase their union fees. Bill Spooner took over and completed the project with the help of the engineer Wood and Scoppa.

Now includes a cover version of Captain Beefheart's "My Head Is My Only House Unless It Rains" and Captain Beefheart also played saxophone on "Cathy's Clone". The project was intended to be a double album but delays led to cutting several songs, including a version of Gene Pitney's "Town Without Pity" complete with horn arrangement by the Bay-area comedian/musician, Dick Bright. The cover of Now was drawn by The Tubes' drummer, Prairie Prince, entitled "Tubes Descending a Staircase", and was inspired by a similar drawing in Time magazine of the Ramones. In an A&M leaflet, they described the album as "This outrageous and zany band have developed musically and visually since their inception in San Francisco and their previous albums".  Anthony believes in retrospect that he should not have tried to be "one of the boys" with this band but remains proud of his idea to have the band playing again live in the studio liked they used to do in the Bay Area bars.

2012 reissue
Real Gone Records reissued Now  with Young and Rich, the band's second album, as a 2-CD set. The liner notes included comments from the drummer Prairie Prince. Unlike the reissues from Iconclassic, this reissue had no bonus tracks. It is currently out of print.

Track listing
"Smoke (La Vie en Fumér)" 4:50 (Bill Spooner, Michael Cotten, Vince Welnick)
"Hit Parade" 3:35 (Bill Spooner, Vince Welnick)
"Strung Out on Strings" 4:10 (Bill Spooner, Roger Steen, Michael Evans)
"Golden Boy" 4:00 (Bill Spooner, Michael Evans)
"My Head Is My Only House Unless It Rains" 4:30 (Don Van Vliet)
"God-Bird-Change" 3:18 (Mingo Lewis)
"I'm Just a Mess" 3:10 (Bill Spooner, Roger Steen)
"Cathy's Clone" 3:30 (The Tubes)
"This Town" 3:15 (Lee Hazlewood)
"Pound of Flesh" 3:00 (Ron Nagle, Scott Mathews)
"You're No Fun" 4:51 (Michael Cotten, Vince Welnick)

Personnel
Fee Waybill - vocals
Bill "The Swami" Spooner - guitar, vocals
Michael Cotten - synthesizer
Mingo Lewis - drums, percussion
Prairie Prince - drums
Roger Steen - guitar, vocals
Re Styles - vocals
Vince Welnick - keyboards
Rick Anderson - bass guitar

Additional personnel
Bud Scoppa - voices
Don Van Vliet - soprano saxophone on "Cathy's Clone" (uncredited)
Harry Duncan - harmonica on "Golden Boy" (uncredited)
Roberta Burger - violin
Technical
Don Wood - engineer, production assistance
Roland Young - art direction
Michael Cotten, Prairie Prince - design

"Special thanks to: Captain Beefheart, Bernie Krause, Rick Bright and his Sounds of Delight Orchestra, Rob Lawrence and Harry Duncan"

References

Now CD liner notes

The Tubes albums
1977 albums
A&M Records albums
Captain Beefheart
Albums produced by John Anthony (record producer)